The Mooney M10 Cadet is a light airplane manufactured by the Mooney Aircraft Company in 1969 and 1970. The M10 is derived from the ERCO Ercoupe, the type certificates for which Mooney purchased from the Alon Corporation in 1967.

Design

The M10 is similar to the Alon A2-A, and indeed a handful of "Mooney A2-As" were built in Kerrville in 1968 before changeover of Mooney's production line was completed.  According to the FAA Type Certificate Data Sheet, the "Model 10 is similar to Model A2-A except for new design empennage, ailerons and fuel tank vent."  The most obvious difference is that the M10 replaces the iconic Ercoupe-style dual vertical stabilizer with a tail designed to allow the airplane to spin.  Changes to the ailerons, along with replacement of the A2-A's tail, were motivated by Mooney's intent to market the M10 as a trainer: student pilots receiving training in a non-spinnable airplane, as the Ercoupe was, were issued FAA pilot certificates carrying the restriction that they could only fly airplanes which were "characteristically incapable of spinning"; thus the spinnable tail was necessary to turn the A2-A into a general-purpose trainer. Given that they were replacing the tail, Mooney's engineers opted to give it the "backward" profile characteristic of the M20 series. Although the M10's empennage has the same silhouette as the "big Mooneys", it does not swivel the way the M20's does; the Cadet's tail is a conventional design with fixed horizontal stabilizer, hinged elevator, and trim tabs.

The two type certificates that cover all Ercoupe variants, including the Mooney M10, are currently owned by Univair Aircraft Corporation, in Aurora, Colorado, USA.

Specifications

See also 
Mooney M10T

References

External links

 An article on flying the M-10
 Univair Aircraft Corporation

Low-wing aircraft
Single-engined tractor aircraft
1960s United States civil utility aircraft
Cadet
Aircraft first flown in 1968